Aşağımirahmet is a village in the Kovancılar District of Elazığ Province in Turkey. Its population is 235 (2021).

References

Villages in Kovancılar District